Love and Light may refer to:
 Love and Light (Proud Mary album) 2004
 Love and Light (Count Basic album), 2007